Sir Roy Malcolm Anderson  (born 12 April 1947) is a leading international authority on the epidemiology and control of infectious diseases. He is the author, with Robert May, of the most highly cited book in this field, entitled Infectious Diseases of Humans: Dynamics and Control. His early work was on the population ecology of infectious agents before focusing on the epidemiology and control of human infections. His published research includes studies of the major viral, bacterial and parasitic infections of humans, wildlife and livestock. This has included major studies on HIV, SARS, foot and mouth disease, bovine tuberculosis, bovine spongiform encephalopathy (BSE), influenza A, antibiotic resistant bacteria, the neglected tropical diseases and most recently COVID-19. Anderson is the author of over 650 peer-reviewed scientific articles with an h-index of 125.

Education and early life 
Anderson was born the son of James Anderson and Betty Watson-Weatherburn. He attended Duncombe School, Bengeo and Richard Hale School. He was awarded a Bachelor of Science degree in zoology at Imperial College London followed by a PhD in parasitology in 1971.

Career and research
He moved to the Biomathematics Department at the University of Oxford as an IBM research fellow working on stochastic models of infectious disease spread under Professor Maurice Bartlett FRS. He was appointed to a Lectureship in Parasitology at King's College London in 1974 before moving back to Imperial as a lecturer in Ecology and then becoming Professor of Parasite Ecology in 1982. He was head of the Department of Biology from 1984 to 1993. At Imperial College, he also served as Director of the Wellcome Centre for Parasite Infections from 1989 to 1993.

In 1993 Anderson moved to the University of Oxford where he was head of the Zoology department and held the Linacre Chair of Zoology at Merton College, Oxford until 2000. During this time he founded and served as Director of the Wellcome Centre for the Epidemiology of Infectious Disease - the first such centre in the UK entirely focused on research into the epidemiology and control of infectious diseases. Anderson resigned from Oxford after admitting that he had falsely alleged that a colleague, Sunetra Gupta, had won a position by having an affair with her head of department. His former doctoral students include  Angela Mclean and Sunetra Gupta.

Chief Scientific Advisor of the Ministry of Defence
He was chief scientific advisor to the UK Ministry of Defence from October 2004 to September 2007. After that, he returned to his chair in Infectious Disease Epidemiology at the Department of Infectious Disease Epidemiology at Imperial College London.

Rector of Imperial College
Anderson was appointed the 14th Rector of Imperial College on 1 July 2008. In his time as Rector he focused on strengthening the emphasis on teaching as well as world renown research at Imperial, and on securing a new site in the White City, West London, to facilitate the expansion of Imperial's molecular and biomedical research, halls of residence, support for innovation and entrepreneurship and teaching facilities. He also negotiated the first overseas campus venture for Imperial in partnership with Nanyang Technological University in Singapore which led to the creation of the Lee Kong Chian School of Medicine in Singapore designed to train doctors to meet Singapore Healthcare needs. He tendered his resignation in November 2009 stating his wish to return to his primary interest in scientific research on global health issues.

Director of the London Centre for Neglected Tropical Disease Research 
He established the London Centre for Neglected Tropical Diseases (LCNTDR) in 2013. The LCNTDR was launched with the aim of providing focused operational and research support for NTD control. The LCNTDR member institutions house leading NTD experts with a wide range of specialties, making the centre a valuable resource for cross-sectoral research and collaboration. It is a joint initiative between the Royal Veterinary College, Imperial College London, the London School of Hygiene & Tropical Medicine, and the Natural History Museum, London.

Membership of Councils, Boards and Committees (National and International) 
He has sat on numerous government and international agency committees advising on public health and disease control including the World Health Organization, The European Commission, UNAIDS, and the Bill and Melinda Gates Foundation.

He is currently a Vice-President of Fauna Flora International, Chairman of Oriole Global Health Limited, Director of the London Centre for Neglected Tropical Disease Research, Trustee of the Banga Trust and a Trustee of the London Institute for Mathematical Sciences.

He was a non-executive director of GlaxoSmithKline 2008–2018, a member of the International Advisory Board of Hakluyt and Company Ltd. 2008–2019, and Chairman of the International Advisory Board of PTTGC Company Thailand, 2014–2018.

Other memberships:

 Member of the International Advisory Board of the Malaysian Government Biotechnology Initiative (Biotechnology Corporation), 2010-2017
 Chairman Pearson Independent Advisory Board on Making Education Work, 2012-2018
 Member of the Singapore National Research Foundation Fellowship Advisory Board, 2012-2015
 Trustee of the Natural History Museum, London, 2008–2016. Member of The Royal Society Science Policy Advisory Group, 2008-2014
 Member of the International Advisory Board of the Thailand National Science and Technology Development Agency, 2010-2017
 Chairman, Advisory Board, Gates Schistosomiasis Control Initiative (SCI), Imperial College, 2001-2018
 Member of the advisory panel of The Children's Investment Fund Foundation (CIFF), 2012-2015
 Member of the International Advisory board of ATHENA, (National AIDS Patient Database Charity), Amsterdam, Holland, 2002-2017
 Member of the Singapore National Research Foundation International Advisory Board, 2009-2012
 Chairman of the review board of the National Vaccine research programme in the Netherlands, 2011
 Chairman of the review board of the National Public Health services research in the Netherlands (RIVM), 2010
 Council Member Royal College of Art, 2008-2011
 Member of the Advisory Board of the Grantham Institute for Climate Change, Imperial College, 2007-2010
 Member of the Advisory Board of the Mathematics Institute, Imperial College London, 2007-2010
 Governor of the Institute for Government London, 2007-2011
 Chairman of the World Health Organization Science and Technology Advisory Board on Neglected Tropical Diseases, 2007-2011
 Member Scientific Advisory Board, Bill and Melinda Gates Initiative on Grand Challenges in Global Health, Gates Foundation, 2005-2011
 Chairman of the Defence Research and Development Board, Ministry of Defence UK, 2007-2008
 Chairman of the Major Investments Approval Board (IAB), Ministry of Defence, UK, 2004-2008
 Member of the Defence Council of the United Kingdom, 2004-2007
 Council member of the Engineering and Physical Sciences Research Council (EPSRC), 2004-2007
 Council member of the Royal United Services Institute (RUSI), 2005-2007
 Member of the Department of Health Science Advisory Board for Epidemic Outbreaks, 2001-2011
 Member of the Government Chief Scientist's Science Advisory Board for pandemic influenza, 2003-2010
 Chairman of the Science Advisory Council (SAC) of the UK Government's Department of Environment, Food and Rural Affairs (DEFRA), 2003-2005
 Member of the Science Advisory Committee of the UK Health Protection Agency, 2004-2006
 Member, US National Academies of Science Committee 'Advances in Technology and the Prevention of their Application to Next Generation Biowarfare Agents', 2003–06
 Member World Health Organization (WHO) Advisory Group on SARS, Geneva, 2003
 Member, Health Protections Agency (HPA) Advisory Group on SARS, 2003
 Member of the Advisory Board, Earth Institute, Columbia University, New York USA, 2003-2007
 Chairman, Canadian Innovation Fund Committee for Infectious Disease Research, 2002-2003
 Member of Science Advisory Group, Civil Contingencies Committee, 2001-2002
 Member of Foot and Mouth Scientific Advisory Group, 2001
 Member of the Advisory Board of the Bernard Nocht Institute of Tropical Medicine, Hamburg, 1999-2002
 Member of the International Advisory Panel for the Joint Infrastructure Fund run by Office of Science and Technology and the Wellcome Trust, 1999-2000
 Chairman, UNAIDS reference group on the Epidemiology of HIV/AIDS, 1999–2004.
 Member of the Spongiform Encephalopathy Advisory Committee (SEAC), 1997-2001
 Member of the UNAIDS Vaccine Advisory Committee (VAC) of the Joint United National Programme HIV/AIDS (UNAIDS), 1996-1999
 Member of Joint Committee on Vaccination & Immunisation, Department of Health, 1996-2000
 Member of the Scientific Advisory Board of the Isaac Newton Institute, University of Cambridge, 1995
 Council Member, London School of Hygiene and Tropical Medicine, 1993-2010
 The Wellcome Trust Trustee 1991, Governor, 1992-2000
 Council Member, Royal Postgraduate Medical School, 1992-1995
 Trustee, Tropical Health and Education Trust, 1991-2008

Selected publications

Honours and awards
Anderson was elected a Fellow of the Royal Society (FRS) in 1986, and was knighted in the 2006 Queen's Birthday Honours list. Other awards and honours include:

 Member of the Academia Europaea (MAE)
 Foreign Member, French Academy of Sciences
 Foreign Member, United States of America National Academy of Medicine
 Honorary Fellow, Royal Statistical Society
 Honorary Fellow, Royal Agricultural Society
 Honorary Fellow, Institute of Actuaries
 Honorary Fellow, Royal College of Pathologists
 Honorary Member, British Society for Parasitologists
 Honorary Fellow, Linacre College, Oxford
 Ernst Chain Prize, Imperial College, 2005
 Weldon Memorial Prize 1989
 Croonian Lecture 1994
 Distinguished Statistical Ecologist Award, American Society of Ecology 1998
 Huxley Memorial Medal, Imperial College, 1981
 Scientific Medal, Zoological Society of London, 1982
 C.A. Wright Memorial Medal, British Society for Parasitology, 1986
 David Starr Jordan Prize and Medal, Universities of Stanford, Cornell and Indiana, 1987
 Chalmers Memorial Medal, Royal Society of Tropical Medicine and Hygiene, 1988
 John Hull Grundy Lecture Medal 1990
 Frink Medal for British Zoologists, The Zoological Society of London, 1993
 Joseph Smadel Medal, Infectious Disease Society of America, 1994
 Storer Lecture Medal, University of California, Davis, 1994
 Croonian Prize, Royal Society, 1994
 Leiden Lecture Medal, Institute for Tropical Medicine, Rotterdam, 1995
 Thomas Francis Memorial Lecture Medal, University of Michigan, 1995
 Honorary DSc from the Universities of East Anglia, Aberdeen and Stirling

Personal life 
Anderson married Janet Meyrick in April 2014 and has three step-children.

He enjoys walking, travel to remote destinations, natural history, conservation and wildlife photography.

References 

1947 births
Living people
English zoologists
British epidemiologists
Alumni of Imperial College London
Academics of Imperial College London
Fellows of Merton College, Oxford
Rectors of Imperial College London
Fellows of the Royal Society
Fellows of the Academy of Medical Sciences (United Kingdom)
Knights Bachelor
Chief Scientific Advisers to the Ministry of Defence
Linacre Professors of Zoology
GSK plc people
Members of the National Academy of Medicine